The Statement of 14 Political Activists is an open letter signed by 14 political activists inside Iran, aimed at People of Iran, calling Ali Khamenei to resign his post of Supreme Leader after 20-year tenure. It was published online on tenth anniversary of controversial 2009 Iranian presidential election. One week after first letter, they published another letter asking for abolition of Islamic republic and establishment of a democratic secular government.

Hashem Khastar, Gohar Eshghi (Mother of Sattar Beheshti), Mohammad Maleki (former Tehran University Chancellor), Mohammad Nourizad and Mohammad Karimbeigi (Father of Mostafa Karimbeigi) were among signatories of this letter.

Weeks after the letter was released, 14 female activists inside Iran issued a similar statement on August 5, 2019. These women said theocratic rule has led to "gender apartheid" and "erased" the rights of half of the country’s population; They called on Khamenei to resign.

On August 10, 14 Iranian women's rights activists, who reside outside Iran, published an open letter and expressed their support for previous letters. 

As of September 2019, 16 of 28 signatories, who reside in Iran, have been arrested.

Background
In the midst of 2017–2018 Iranian protests, 15 Iranian intellectuals published an open letter called for a referendum. They wrote:

Signatories included Shirin Ebadi, Nobel peace prize laureate; Narges Mohammadi, a human rights activist imprisoned in Evin prison; Nasrin Sotoudeh, a human rights lawyer imprisoned in Evin prison; and the film-makers Mohsen Makhmalbaf and Jafar Panahi.

Signatories

Signatories of first letter

 Gohar Eshghi (Mother of Sattar Beheshti)
 Hoorieh Farajzadeh (Sister of Shahram Farajzadeh)
 Mohammad Karimbeigi (Father of Mostafa Karimbeigi) 
 Hashem Khastar
 Mohammad Mahdavifar
 Mohammad Maleki (former Chancellor of Tehran University)
 Javad La'l Mohammadi
 Mohammad Nourizad
 Mohammad Hossein Sepehri
 Abbas Vahedian Shahroodi
 Kamal Jaafari Yazdi
 Reza Mehrgan
 Mohammadreza Bayat
 Zardosht Ahmadi Ragheb

Signatories of second letter
14 women inside Iran signed this letter:

 Shahla Entesari
 Nosrat Beheshti
 Fereshteh Tasvibi
 Parva Pachideh
 Giti Pourfazel
 Zahra Jamali
 Shahla Jahanbin
 Ezzat Javadi-Hesar
 Fatemeh Sepehri
 Maryam Soleimani
 Soosan Taherkhani
 Farangis Mazloom (Mother of Soheil Arabi)
 Narges Mansouri
 Kimia Norouzi-Saber

Signatories of third letter
14 women outside Iran signed this letter:

 Nazanin Afshin-Jam
 Roya Boroumand
 Ladan Boroumand
 Nazanin Bonyadi
 Azam Bahrami
 Roya Hakakian
 Naeemeh Doostdar
 Masih Alinejad
 Nahid Farhad
 Mehrangiz Kar
 Sheema Kalbasi
 Maryam Memar-Sadeghi
 Azar Nafisi
 Leily Nikounazar

Support
The Letters found many supporters and was widely shared on social media.  Many Iranian women's rights activists and famous artists, authors and human rights advocates abroad offered their support for the women.

I am 15th
Giti Pourfazel, a lawyer who is one of the signatories, told Radio Farda that other Iranian women could count themselves as the 15th signatory. Many Iranian celebrities and Twitter users expressed their support.

Court Sentences
 In March 2020, a court in Iran sentenced Reza Mehregan, one of the fourteen signatories, to six years in prison and 74 lashes. A few months earlier a court in Mashhad sentenced eight of those activists who asked Khamenei to resign, to a total of 72 years in prison.

See also
 Human rights in the Islamic Republic of Iran

References

Human rights in Iran
Women's rights movement in Iran
Women's rights in Iran
Political manifestos
Open letters
Ali Khamenei